Kill the Messenger: How the CIA's Crack-cocaine Controversy Destroyed Journalist Gary Webb (New York: Nation Books, 2006) is a biography of investigative journalist Gary Webb, focusing on his 1996 "Dark Alliance" investigative series in the San Jose Mercury News. The series linked the 1980s' crack cocaine trade in the United States and the CIA-backed Nicaraguan Contras.

Kill the Messenger was adapted into a 2014 film by the same name.

Editions
  (2006)
  (2009)
  (2014)

External links

Reviews

Interviews 

Non-fiction books about the Central Intelligence Agency
Non-fiction books about the illegal drug trade
2006 non-fiction books
Biographies adapted into films
The Mercury News
Books about cocaine
Nation Books books